Yoon Byung-Soon (Korean: 윤병순; born November 27, 1963), also spelled as Yun Byeong-Sun, is a former South Korean team handball player and Olympic medalist. She received a silver medal with the South Korean team at the 1984 Summer Olympics in Los Angeles.

References

External links

1963 births
Living people
South Korean female handball players
Olympic handball players of South Korea
Handball players at the 1984 Summer Olympics
Olympic silver medalists for South Korea
Olympic medalists in handball
Medalists at the 1984 Summer Olympics
20th-century South Korean women